Pol Hom (born 3 February 1946) is a Cambodian politician and Member of Parliament for Takéo Province. He is the co-Vice President of the Cambodia National Rescue Party. On 26 August 2014, he was elected chairman of the National Assembly Commission on Planning.

References

1946 births
Living people
Cambodia National Rescue Party politicians
Human Rights Party (Cambodia) politicians 
Members of the National Assembly (Cambodia)
Buddhist Liberal Democratic Party politicians